Unholy Terror is the ninth studio album by the American heavy metal band W.A.S.P., released in 2001.
It is viewed by many fans and critics alike as an 'issue' album, going into great detail about the world and all its vices. This is the last album to feature W.A.S.P. guitarist Chris Holmes.

Track listing

Personnel
W.A.S.P.
Blackie Lawless – vocals, guitars, keyboards, producer
Chris Holmes – lead guitar 
Mike Duda – bass, vocals
Stet Howland – drums, vocals

Guest musicians
Frankie Banali – drums (on tracks 2, 3, 5, 8 and 10)
Roy Z – lead guitar (on tracks 6 and 10)
 Valentina – chorus (on track 6)

Production
BIll Metoyer – engineer
Dan Biechele – assistant engineer and production manager
Richard Kaplan, Chuck Johnson – mixing at Indigoranch, Malibu, California
Tom Baker – mastering at Precision Mastering
Kosh – album design

Charts

References

W.A.S.P. albums
2001 albums
Albums produced by Blackie Lawless